S. Vetrivel is an Indian politician and incumbent member of the Tamil Nadu Legislative Assembly from the Omalur constituency. He represents the Anna Dravida Munnetra Kazhagam.

References

All India Anna Dravida Munnetra Kazhagam politicians
Living people
Members of the Tamil Nadu Legislative Assembly
People from Salem district
Year of birth missing (living people)